Gonnosnò is a comune (municipality) in the Province of Oristano in the Italian region Sardinia, located about  northwest of Cagliari and about  southeast of Oristano.

Gonnosnò borders the following municipalities: Albagiara, Ales, Baradili, Baressa, Curcuris, Genoni, Simala, Sini, Usellus.

References

Cities and towns in Sardinia